Boyd County is a county in the U.S. state of Nebraska. As of the 2010 United States Census, the population was 2,099. Its county seat is Butte. The county was formed in 1891 and named after James E. Boyd, the governor of Nebraska at the time.

In the Nebraska license plate system, Boyd County is represented by the prefix 63, as it had the 63rd-largest number of vehicles registered in the county when the license plate system was established in 1922.

In the 2010 United States Census, three incorporated villages had populations of fewer than 10 people: Anoka, population 6, Gross, population 2, and Monowi, population 1. Monowi was the only incorporated city in the United States with only one resident at the 2010 census.

All land north of the Keya Paha River (which includes most of Boyd County and a smaller portion of neighboring Keya Paha County) was not originally part of Nebraska at the time of statehood, but was transferred from Dakota Territory in 1882.

Geography

Boyd County is in Nebraska's Outback region.

Major highways
  U.S. Highway 281
  Nebraska Highway 11
  Nebraska Highway 12

Adjacent counties
 Charles Mix County, South Dakota - northeast
 Knox County - southeast
 Holt County - south
 Rock County - southwest
 Keya Paha County - west
 Gregory County, South Dakota - northwest

National protected areas
 Karl E. Mundt National Wildlife Refuge (part)
 Missouri National Recreational River (part)

Demographics

As of the 2000 United States Census, there were 2,438 people, 1,014 households, and 670 families in the county. The population density was 4 people per square mile (2/km2).  There were 1,406 housing units at an average density of 3 per square mile (1/km2). The racial makeup of the county was 98.89% White, 0.57% Native American, 0.16% Asian, and 0.37% from two or more races. 0.08% of the population were Hispanic or Latino of any race. 45.2% were of German, 10.0% American, 9.3% Czech, 7.8% Irish, 6.9% English and 5.9% Swedish ancestry.

There were 1,014 households, out of which 29.00% had children under the age of 18 living with them, 59.40% were married couples living together, 3.70% had a female householder with no husband present, and 33.90% were non-families. 32.00% of all households were made up of individuals, and 19.60% had someone living alone who was 65 years of age or older. The average household size was 2.36 and the average family size was 2.98.

The county population contained 25.00% under the age of 18, 5.40% from 18 to 24, 21.20% from 25 to 44, 24.10% from 45 to 64, and 24.30% who were 65 years of age or older. The median age was 44 years. For every 100 females there were 93.30 males. For every 100 females age 18 and over, there were 94.60 males.

The median income for a household in the county was $26,075, and the median income for a family was $32,000. Males had a median income of $20,859 versus $17,688 for females. The per capita income for the county was $13,840. About 12.90% of families and 15.20% of the population were below the poverty line, including 19.60% of those under age 18 and 11.20% of those age 65 or over.

Communities

Villages

 Anoka
 Bristow
 Butte (county seat)
 Gross
 Lynch
 Monowi
 Naper
 Spencer

Townships

 Basin
 Bristow
 Bush
 Butte
 Lynch
 McCulley
 Morton
 Mullen
 Spencer

Ghost towns
 Baker
 Doty
 Mankato
 Rosedale

Politics

See also
 National Register of Historic Places listings in Boyd County, Nebraska
 Nuclear Nebraska

References

Further reading 
  - Profile

 
Nebraska counties
Nebraska counties on the Missouri River
1891 establishments in Nebraska
Populated places established in 1891